Eje Öberg (born: 8 November 1958) is a sailor from Haninge Municipality, Sweden. who represented his country at the 1988 Summer Olympics in Busan, South Korea as crew member in the Soling. With helmsman Lennart Persson and fellow crew members Tony Wallin they took the 8th place.

References

Living people
1958 births
Sailors at the 1988 Summer Olympics – Soling
Olympic sailors of Sweden
Swedish male sailors (sport)
20th-century Swedish people